Stratton is a market town in Cornwall, England situated near the coastal town of Bude and the market town of Holsworthy. It was also the name of one of ten ancient administrative hundreds of Cornwall. The Battle of Stratton during the Civil War took place here on 16 May 1643.

Etymology
The earliest form of the name in Old English is Strætneat deriving from the original Cornish "Strad-Neth", with Strad meaning "The flat-bottomed valley of the River" and Neth being the name of the river itself.

In common with most hydronymy in Western Europe, the name Neth is known to be Celtic or Pre-Celtic; however, the etymology of the name remains uncertain. A meaning of shining or brilliant has been suggested, as has a link to the older Indo-European root *-nedi (simply meaning river). Today, the river is commonly referred to as the Strat in English, from an erroneous back formation of Stratton ("town on the Strat").

The town likely shares its etymology with the river and town of Neath in South Wales and the River Nidd in Northern England. The river is known as both the River Neet and the River Strat.

History

The earliest known references to Stratton are found in King Alfred's Will of c. 880 and the Domesday survey of 1086. (For the Stratton Hundred: see under Government below.)

At the time of the Domesday Survey the manor of Stratton had land for 30 ploughs. There were 30 villeins, 20 smallholders and 20 slaves. There were 10 salt houses, 20 acres of woodland, 200 acres of pasture, 30 cattle and 300 sheep. Before the conquest the manor had been held by Bishop Osbern and Alfred the Marshal; its value in 1086 was £35-18-4d. Stratton Manor House on Diddies Road has now been converted into apartments.

The town has given its name to a traditional folk ballad, "The Stratton Carol".

Religion

One of the most prominent buildings in Stratton is the 12th century Norman church dedicated to Saint Andrew which holds a central and elevated position within the town. It is listed Grade I. The church contains a brass to Sir John Arundell of Trerice, 1561.

As well as the main church, there were also other chapels around the village; this indicates a large population because only one church would not suffice. This is also supported by the existence of the large, old tithe barn; it needed to be large enough to hold the tax of one-tenth of their earnings/produce that all villagers paid to the church. The area around Cot Hill was an important sanctuary for pilgrims travelling the pilgrimage route to Hartland during Medieval times. However, many of the chapels are derelict or have now been converted, suggesting the population decline has been so great as to leave only enough people to use the church and one remaining chapel.

Justice
The town once had a jail, a police station and a courthouse, but the police station has now been moved to Bude, the jail demolished and the courthouse converted into two dwellings. The door of the jail, marked "CLINK", is still visible in the church porch. The following quotation indicates Stratton's importance as a centre of justice: "As Stratton Town and the surrounding villages grew, the need to administer civil and criminal law from an appropriate location was necessary."

Government
The name Stratton was given to the unit of government for taxation during Saxon times, known as a 'hundred'. Stratton was the head of its hundred due to its importance in comparison to that of the local towns and villages, including Kilkhampton, Marhamchurch, Boyton, Jacobstow, Whitstone, Stratton itself, Poughill, Bridgerule, Week St Mary, Launcells, North Tamerton and Morwenstow.

The hundred is an indicator of Stratton's importance not only for these reasons, but also because in the whole of Cornwall, there were only nine hundreds and all of them had their own courts. This suggests that not only did Stratton have a courthouse, it was probably the only one in the Stratton Hundred. (At the time of Domesday Book there were only seven hundreds: the hundred of Trigg was later divided into Trigg, Lesnewth and Stratton. Stratton manor was the head manor of Trigg Hundred in Domesday Book.)

In 1866 the ancient parish of Stratton, which included Bude and rural areas to the south and east of Bude and Stratton, became a civil parish.

The functions of the Stratton Hundred were effectively replaced by the Stratton Rural District established by the Local Government Act 1894. In 1900 most of the civil parish of Stratton, including the towns of Stratton and Bude, together with the villages of Upton and Lynstone, and also Flexbury from the civil parish of Poughill, were transferred from the Rural District to the new Bude–Stratton Urban District. The remainder of the civil parishes of Stratton and Poughill were transferred to Bude–Stratton Urban District in 1934.

Both the Urban District and Stratton Rural District were abolished in 1974 and became part of North Cornwall District, itself abolished in 2009 when the present Cornwall Council was formed.

Trade and industry

Trade and industry greatly affected Stratton's popularity; it had a thriving leather and agricultural trade. During medieval times it dealt in leather. Evidence of this is the road named after the trade. Poundfield area was where the animals were kept; Stratton also housed tanning pits and a rack park, where the leather was stretched. There is also evidence of farming in the milking parlours, barns and stalls that are made from cob, a traditional building material, and the Old Malt House shows where ale was produced in the church-owned brewery. During medieval times herbs and spices were also considered important for medicinal purposes as well as others, and Stratton was famous for having an abundance of wild garlic.

Trade events such as markets and fairs were a regular occurrence in Stratton and people would come from all around to attend. Much of the evidence for events and trades in Stratton is subtle, for example, street names like Market Street and Poundfield Lane. Stratton had up to 14 pubs, although some were houses where people brewed beer themselves. Many have now been knocked down or converted, but some, such as the Tree Inn, are still running, despite perhaps fewer customers than they would have expected before Bude became the main town. Although many of the shops that once lined the streets have now been converted into homes, the large front windows still hint at the lives led by the inhabitants when Stratton was the most important town in the area.

19th and 20th centuries

Trade directories allow comparison of the two towns. For example, in 1844, when Stratton had six shoemakers, Bude had only one, although Slater's Trade Directory 1852–1853 shows the period in which Bude was beginning to catch up, although Stratton was still thriving. One of the main factors which led to the demise of Stratton's influence was New Road which directed traffic away from the centre of Stratton in the early 20th century. The bypass was then built in 1950 when Stratton was well and truly defeated. Following the 1960s rail closures Stratton and Bude became the two towns most remote from the rail network in England. Despite the downfall of Stratton, it still managed to keep the hospital and surgery running although the union and workhouse from the 1830s were no longer operating.

Notable people

 Richard Maynard (1832–1907), a Canadian photographer known mainly for his landscape views, born in Stratton

See also

Battle of Stratton
List of topics related to Cornwall

References

Further reading
Bere, Rennie and Stamp, Bryan Dudley (1980), The Book of Bude and Stratton. Buckingham: Barracuda Books 
Peachey, Stuart (1993), The Battle of Stratton 1643. Stuart Press

External links

Cornwall Record Office Online Catalogue for Stratton

Market towns in Cornwall
Towns in Cornwall
Manors in Cornwall
Former civil parishes in Cornwall